The National Gugak Center, located in Seoul, South Korea, is the primary institution of learning for Korean traditional music, including both court music and folk music. It was founded in 1951 through a merger of Korean musical organizations.

It is dedicated to "preserving and promoting traditional Korean music."  Through academic courses, private study, ensembles, research, and performances, it preserves Korea's ancient musical traditions, including the ancient court ritual music called aak as well as the ritual music performed for the Jongmyo (royal ancestral shrine) and the Munmyo (Confucian shrine).

Historical musical organizations

While Korean court music dates back to the  music institute of the Silla kingdom in the 7th century, the present  is the direct successor to the Jangakwon music institution of the Joseon Dynasty. Jangakwon went through various name changes until 1945:
Jangakwon 장악원 掌樂院 (1470)
Gyobangsa 교방사 敎坊司 (1897)
Jangakgwa 장악과 掌樂課 (1907)
Yiwangjik Aakdae 이왕직아악대 李王職雅樂隊 (1910) ("Music Troupe of the Board for the Yi Household"), after the Japanese colonisation
Yiwangjik Aakbu 이왕직아악부 李王職雅樂部 (1913) ("Music Department of the Board for the Yi Household")
Guwanggung Aakbu 구왕궁아악부 舊王宮雅樂部 (1945) ("Music Department of the Former Royal Household") under the US military government.

The Music Department of the Former Royal Household merged with other Korean music organizations in 1951 to form the National Center for Korean Traditional Performing Arts (Gugnip Gugakwon 국립국악원 國立國樂院). In 2010 the English name was officially shortened to the National Gugak Center while the Korean name remained unchanged.

Other

In 2018, the organization added fifty more types of sounds and instruments to their repertoire as the pop song "Idol", which includes some  instruments.

See also
Music of Korea
Alan Heyman

References

External links 

 
 National Gugak Center at Google Cultural Institute

Seocho District
1950 establishments in South Korea
Korean traditional music
Arts centres in South Korea